The Tempted Stakes is an American Thoroughbred horse race held annually since 1975 at Aqueduct Racetrack in Jamaica, New York. Run near the end of October, the ungraded stakes race is open to 2-year-old fillies and is contested on dirt over a distance of one mile (8 furlongs). It currently offers a purse of $100,000.

The race is named in honor of Tempted, voted U.S. Champion Handicap Mare in 1959.

In 1976, the race mare, Pearl Necklace, won this race.  Our Mims placed.  In 1979, it was won by the future U.S. Racing Hall of Fame inductee Genuine Risk and in 1990 by another future  Hall of Famer, Flawlessly.

For 2011 only, the distance was shortened to 6 furlongs. It was changed from Aqueduct to Belmont Park and moved to earlier in the month as a prep for the inaugural Breeders' Cup Juvenile Sprint that was run on November 4 of that year.

Records
Speed record:
 1:36.09 @ 1 mile: Summer Raven (2004)

Most wins by a jockey:
 4 - John Velazquez (1993, 2001, 2002, 2003)

Most wins by a trainer:
 5 -Todd A. Pletcher (2001, 2002, 2004, 2009, 2013, 2020)

Most wins by an owner:
 2 - Mrs. Bertram R. Firestone (1979, 1989)

Winners

References

Horse races in New York City
Aqueduct Racetrack
Flat horse races for two-year-old fillies
Ungraded stakes races in the United States
Previously graded stakes races in the United States
Recurring sporting events established in 1975